Leila Zare (Persian : لیلا زارع , born  in Tehran, Iran) is an Iranian actress known for her roles in We Are All Fine (2005), Goodbye (2011) and Night Shift (2015).

Career 
Zareh was nominated under the category of "Best Performance by an Actress" in the Asia Pacific Screen Awards, and won the Crystal Simorgh under the category of "Best Supporting Actress" for her role in Ma Hameh Khoubim in 2005, in the 23rd Fajr International Film Festival. In 2015, she was awarded the Diploma of Honour under the category of "Best Actress" for the film; Shift-e Shab in the 33rd Fajr International Film Festival. Her notable works include the role of Noura in the 2011 film Goodbye, Nahi in 2015's Night Shift, and Nahid in We Are All Fine.

Filmography 
 2021: Anti
 2020: Blood
 2020: Filicide
 2019: Dell (TV Series)
 2019: Reverse
 2017: Azar
 2017: Forbidden
 2017: Human Comedy
 2017: Phenomenon
 2016: Final Exam
 2016: Samfonie Tavalod
 2015: Night Shift
 2013: The Little Sparrows
 2011: Goodbye
 2010: Leila's Dream
 2009: Superstar
 2009: Postchi se bar dar nemizanad
 2008: Majnoone leyli
 2007: Mika
 2006: Khaneye roshan
 2005: We Are All Fine

See also 
 Mina Sadati
 List of Iranian Actresses
Golshifteh Farahani
Mohammad Reza Forutan
Fajr International Film Festival

References

External links 

 http://fajriff.com/en/

1980 births
Living people
People from Tehran
Actresses from Tehran
Iranian film actresses
Iranian television actresses
Crystal Simorgh for Best Supporting Actress winners